Nathenial "Nath" Arkley (born 27 October 1994) is an Australian Paralympic track and field athlete. At the 2012 Summer Paralympics, he won a bronze medal.

Personal
Arkley was born on 27 October 1994. He is a paraplegic as a result of the viral infection, transverse myelitis, he caught when he was eight years old. , he lives in St Agnes, South Australia. He attended St Pauls College in Gilles Plains.

Athletics

Arkley is a T54 classified athlete. He has a special three carbon wheeled racing wheelchair. He has been coached by John Hammon since 2009.

Arkley started competing in wheelchair athletics in 2005. Prior to his paraplegia, he participated in track at school. He first represented Australian in 2009. At the Swiss hosted 2009 IWAS Junior World Championships, he won five silver medals and two gold medals. In 2012, he won the Oz Day 10K men's junior division. He sometimes trains with Jake Lappin. In 2012, he would train by wheeling up to  a week. He was selected to represent Australia at the 2012 Summer Paralympics in athletics. Arkley participated in the Men's 5000 m T54, Men's Marathon T54, and the Men's 4 × 400 m T53/54 – winning a bronze in the 4 × 400 m.

References

External links
 
 
 Natheniel Arkley at Australian Athletics Historical Results

Paralympic athletes of Australia
Paralympic bronze medalists for Australia
Living people
1994 births
Athletes (track and field) at the 2012 Summer Paralympics
People with paraplegia
Wheelchair category Paralympic competitors
Medalists at the 2012 Summer Paralympics
Paralympic medalists in athletics (track and field)